Almus, also known as Alme, Alanus, was a Cistercian abbot. Almus entered religious life as a monk at Melrose Abbey, Scotland, before being appointed abbot at Balmerino Abbey.

References

Medieval Scottish saints
13th-century Christian saints
1270 deaths
Scottish Cistercians
13th-century Scottish Roman Catholic priests
Year of birth unknown